The Cartoon Song is a contemporary Christian song by Chris Rice, written in 1989 as a tongue-in-cheek skit for a church youth group of middle school students. The song mentions many cartoon characters popular in the United States at that time.

Lyrics

The premise of the song describes what might happen if Christians succeeded in incorporating Christianity into cartoons. According to the song, cartoon characters would then sing their own versions of the word "Hallelujah". For example, Fred and Wilma Flintstone would sing "Yabba-dabba-lujah".

The song also mentions Scooby-Doo and Shaggy, Astro, the Teenage Mutant Ninja Turtles, Kermit the Frog, Elmer Fudd, Yogi Bear, Rocky and Bullwinkle, the Smurfs (referred to as "all those little blue guys"), and Beavis and Butt-head (referred to as Beavis and "that other guy").

Hidden track

Chris Rice wrote the song while in college, as a joke for students, but after much success, his former record label insisted that he record it for a CD. He reluctantly agreed, although only if it was a hidden track.

Reactions

This track has received a lot of criticism from the Christian community due to its theology, more evidence that Rice's satirical intentions went well over the heads of his fans.  Chris Rice explains, "Also, in correcting my 'theology' in the cartoon song, people were totally missing the fact that the whole song is about soul-less cartoons, none of whom can 'get saved.'"

This song has also led to a boycott by Bible Belt Conservatives and some fans of Chris Rice's music.  According to Rice's website article, Rice's intention was to "bring attention to the silliness of the typical Christian over-reaction to Beavis and Butthead during their popularity. By calling Butthead 'the other guy' I was satirizing many who were 'offended' by that name.  I was also trying to point out the snobbery of those who would limit Christianity to only a certain type of person. Many fans misinterpreted my satire of THEM as if I were making a statement of my own beliefs. You can see why I have no desire to perpetuate the life of this song."

Despite demand for the song, Rice stopped performing the song live in 2004, prompting Rice to write an article for his own official website entitled "Eulogy for a Song About Cartoons." In the article Rice explains that his misunderstood intention in writing the song/skit was to mock the commercial-Christian tendency to "make a Christian version of everything." Rice states, "I was hoping everyone would get the satire, but they missed the satire, and embraced the song as legit." This legitimizing of the song, evidence of his fans' misunderstanding of the purpose of the song/skit, frustrated Rice to the point of eliminating the song from his live performances, as well as refusal to discuss the song in interviews on the air. In 2004, Rice decided to stop playing the song at concerts. He has kept to his decision, despite popular demand for the song, and despite that Christian radio stations played the song frequently at the time.

Footnotes

External links
Feature on Chris Rice in The Baptist StandardThe Fish'' on Chris Rice
Crosswalk.com on the "Cartoons" controversy

Contemporary Christian songs
Novelty songs
Satirical songs
1989 songs
Songs about comics
Songs about television